The 1976 Kilkenny Senior Hurling Championship was the 82nd staging of the Kilkenny Senior Hurling Championship since its establishment by the Kilkenny County Board.

James Stephens were the defending champions.

James Stephens won the championship after a 2-14 to 0-13 defeat of Rower-Inistioge in the final. It was their fifth championship title overall and their second title in succession.

References

Kilkenny Senior Hurling Championship
Kilkenny Senior Hurling Championship